SAS Group destinations This is a complete list of the SAS Group airlines destinations, including Air Greenland, Scandinavian Airlines and Widerøe. In September 2010 the SAS Group airlines served 180 destinations in 35 countries on 4 continents.

List
GL = Air Greenland
SK = Scandinavian Airlines
WF = Widerøe

References

Annotations 

Lists of airline destinations
SAS Group
Star Alliance destinations